Matej Šebenik (born 28 August 1983) is a Slovene chess player. He was awarded the title of Grandmaster (GM) by FIDE in 2012. He won the Slovenian Chess Championship in 2014. In 2009, he won the San Sebastián tournament.

Šebenik has played for team Slovenia in the Chess Olympiad, European Team Chess Championship, Mitropa Cup and European Youth Team Championship. His team won the gold medal in the 2005 Mitropa Cup.

References

External links 
Matej Sebenik chess games at 365Chess.com

1983 births
Living people
Chess grandmasters
Slovenian chess players
Chess Olympiad competitors
Sportspeople from Ljubljana